Rostokino is a station on the Moscow Central Circle of the Moscow Metro that opened in September 2016.

Name
The station name, which was originally planned to be Yaroslavskaya, was changed in August 2016 to Rostokino for the Rostokino District.

Gallery

References

External links 
 mkzd.ru

Moscow Metro stations
Railway stations in Russia opened in 2016
Moscow Central Circle stations